Rhiscosomides is a genus of millipedes in the order Chordeumatida with seven described species, and is the only genus in the family Rhiscosomididae. Adult millipedes in this family have 30 segments (counting the collum as the first segment and the telson as the last).

References

Further reading

 
 
 
 

Chordeumatida
Millipede genera